Paul Carroll may refer to:

 Paul Carroll (poet) (1926–1996), American poet
 Paul T. Carroll (1910–1954), United States Army brigadier general
 Paul Vincent Carroll (1900–1968), Irish dramatist and writer
 Paul Carroll (volleyball) (born 1986), Australian volleyball player